Robert "Duke" Foster Jr. (January 23, 1929 – July 20, 1973) was an American college football player and coach. He served as the head football coach at Morehouse College in Atlanta from 1957 to 1966, compiling a record of 27–47–4.

Foster was born on January 23, 1929, in Atlanta. He graduated from Northwestern High School in Detroit in 1947 and entered Morehouse College as a student that  fall. He played football at Morehouse as an end from 1947 to 1950, captaining the Tigers and earning All-Southern Intercollegiate Athletic Conference (SIAC) honors in 1949. He also played basketball as a center and baseball at the school. After graduating from Morehouse in 1951, he served two years in the United States Marine Corps, attaining the rank of lieutenant. After leaving the Marines, Foster earned a master's degree in health and physical education from New York University (NYU) and returned to Morehouse as an instructor and coach in 1955. He died on July 20, 1973.

Head coaching record

References

1929 deaths
1973 deaths
American football ends
Centers (basketball)
Morehouse Maroon Tigers baseball players
Morehouse Maroon Tigers basketball players
Morehouse Maroon Tigers football coaches
Morehouse Maroon Tigers football players
New York University alumni
United States Marine Corps officers
United States Marine Corps personnel of the Korean War
Coaches of American football from Michigan
Players of American football from Atlanta
Players of American football from Detroit
Baseball players from Atlanta
Baseball players from Detroit
Basketball players from Atlanta
African-American coaches of American football
African-American players of American football
African-American baseball players
African-American basketball players
African-American military personnel
20th-century African-American sportspeople